Siete Caballeros is a mountain in the Raura mountain range in the Andes of Peru with several peaks reaching approximately  above sea level. It is located in the province of Lauricocha, in the region of Huánuco. Siete Caballeros lies north of Puyhuanccocha.

References

Mountains of Peru
Mountains of Huánuco Region